Heat Wave is a 1935 British comedy film directed by Maurice Elvey and starring Albert Burdon, Cyril Maude and Les Allen. 

It was titled The Code originally.

Plot
A British vegetable salesman accidentally gets mixed up in a planned revolution in South America.

Cast
 Albert Burdon as Albert Speed  
 Cyril Maude as President Allison  
 Les Allen as Tom Brown  
 Anna Lee as Jane Allison  
 Vera Pearce as Gloria Spania  
 Bernard Nedell as Gen. Da Costa  
 C. Denier Warren as Col. D'Alvarez  
 Bruce Winston as Lerone  
 Edmund Willard as Hoffman 
 Finlay Currie as Captain 
 Grace Poggi as Dancer

Production
It was made at Islington Studios by Gainsborough Pictures. The film's sets were designed by the Austrian art director Oscar Friedrich Werndorff.

References

Bibliography
 Low, Rachael. Filmmaking in 1930s Britain. George Allen & Unwin, 1985.
 Wood, Linda. British Films, 1927-1939. British Film Institute, 1986.

External links

1935 films
British comedy films
1935 comedy films
1930s English-language films
Islington Studios films
Films directed by Maurice Elvey
Films set in South America
British black-and-white films
1930s British films
Films about salespeople